The Chrysler Java was a concept car created by Chrysler. The Chrysler Java was first introduced at the 1999 Frankfurt Motor Show. Its design was based upon the Chrysler minivans.

The Java was powered by a 1.4 L 4-cylinder engine. It used a five-speed manual transmission.

The Java's design was more likely architectural than automotive. The Java had an egg-like shape, and also had tall taillights. The Java was originally painted in black, and was later repainted to a light green-silver metallic.

External links
The Chrysler Java description at "The Car Enthusiast"
The Java's technical specifications

Java